Martín Juan Zbrun (born January 27, 1985) is an Argentine football defender, who plays for Cobreloa.

Honours
Atlético de Rafaela
Primera B Nacional (1): 2010–11

External links

1985 births
Living people
Argentine footballers
Argentine expatriate footballers
Association football midfielders
Atlético de Rafaela footballers
Instituto footballers
Cobreloa footballers
Chilean Primera División players
Argentine Primera División players
Expatriate footballers in Chile
People from Rafaela
Sportspeople from Santa Fe Province